Ittla Frodi (17 February 1931 – 18 February 2003) was a Swedish actress, writer and producer. Frodi appeared in about 15 films between 1954 and 1971.

Selected filmography
En karl i köket (1954)
 The Girl in the Rain (1955)
 We at Väddö (1958)
Space Invasion of Lapland (1959)
Sköna Susanna och gubbarna (1959)
Vi fixar allt (1961)
Åsa-Nisse bland grevar och baroner (1961)
Hällebäcks gård (1961)
The Mannequin (1968)
Tant Grön, tant Brun och tant Gredelin (1968)
Maid in Sweden (1971)

References

External links
 

1931 births
2003 deaths
Swedish film actresses